Timothy C. Tennent (born September 24, 1959) is an American theologian who is the current president of Asbury Theological Seminary.

Education
Tennent's education includes a B.A. from Oral Roberts University, an M.Div. from Gordon Conwell (1984), a Th.M. from Princeton Theological Seminary (1991), and a Ph.D. from the University of Edinburgh's Centre for the Study of Christianity in the Non-Western World (1998), where his dissertation was on Indian theologian Brahmabandhab Upadhyay.

Tennent studied under Professor John Brockington, Dr James Cox, and Professor Andrew Walls, and his research focused on the rapidly growing churches outside the West. His Ph.D. dissertation was revised and published in 2000 under the title Building Christianity on Indian Foundations.

Tennent is also one of four graduates of a three-year mentoring in academic leadership program funded through a Lilly Endowment grant.

Career
Tennent is an ordained elder (minister) in the United Methodist Church in the Kentucky Annual Conference. He is also a direct descendant of William Tennent, the founder of Log College, which was the precursor to Princeton University.

Tennent began his teaching career at Toccoa Falls College, where he was named Teacher of the Year in 1995. From 1998–2009, he served as professor of world missions and Indian studies at Gordon-Conwell Theological Seminary in South Hamilton, Massachusetts.

He was elected to his current post as president of Asbury Seminary on February 17, 2009, and his tenure began on July 1, 2009. Tennent succeeded Ellsworth Kalas as president of Asbury. He continues to serve as a visiting professor at the Luther W. New Jr. Theological College of Dehradun, India where he has taught each summer since 1988.

In November 2009, Tennent signed an ecumenical statement known as the Manhattan Declaration calling on evangelicals, Catholics and Orthodox not to comply with rules and laws permitting abortion, same-sex marriage and other matters that go against their religious consciences.

Theology
Tennent has a Wesleyan-Arminian theology.

Published works

Books

Articles & chapters

References

1959 births
American theologians
American United Methodist clergy
Arminian ministers
Arminian theologians
Asbury Theological Seminary faculty
Gordon–Conwell Theological Seminary alumni
Living people
Oral Roberts University alumni
People from Atlanta
Princeton University alumni
Seminary presidents
World Christianity scholars
Alumni of the University of Edinburgh School of Divinity